Comparettia macroplectron is an epiphytic species of orchid. It is endemic to Colombia.

References

External links 
 
 

macroplectron
Endemic orchids of Colombia
Plants described in 1878